is a river in Hokkaidō, Japan.

History
Around 1000 years ago, the Okhotsk culture settled the river basin and moved inland. Remains from the Jōmon period have been found on the bottom of Lake Abashiri.

Course
The Abashiri River rises in Tsubetsu on the slopes of Mount Ahoro of the Akan Volcanic Complex. The river leaves the mountains and is joined by Tsubetsu River and Bihoro River before flowing into Lake Abashiri. The river exits the lake and flows into the Sea of Okhotsk at Abashiri.

References

Rivers of Hokkaido
Rivers of Japan